Erlinda Gaerlan Asturias-Aguilar (June 7, 1927 – May 20, 1992), popularity known as Alicia Vergel, was a Filipina actress noted for her roles as fighting women and amazons and, like Norma Blancaflor, for her heart-shaped face.

Early career

Vergel's film credits include Diwani opposite César Ramirez, MN with Carmen Rosales as her arch-enemy, Balisong with Ramon Revilla and Madame X with Gloria Romero as her daughter.  She participated in the unfinished movie Bibingka'y masarap under Sampaguita Pictures in the late 40s.  Her performance as Orang in Basahang Ginto won Vergel the first FAMAS Award for Best Actress in 1952.

In 1977, she starred as the widowed and retired principal and teacher coping up with the demands of aging in Lotus Productions' "Inay" directed by Lino Brocka. The film was an entry in the Metro-Manila Film festival and earned her an acting nomination for lead actress.

In 1987, she was seen in "Saan Nagtatago ang Pag-ibig?" and essayed the role of Señora Pacing as Ricky Davao's aristocratic and strict grandmother.

Personal life

Vegrel had a child, Tomas Aguilar, known as "Boy Vergel" who was killed in a notorious street fight in 1962.

She then married Sampaguita Pictures leading man César Ramirez. They had two children: Ace Vergel (known as "The Original Bad Boy of Philippine Movies"), and Beverly Vergel, actress, acting teacher and currently director of the ABS-CBN Center for Communication Arts, Inc. Vergel and Ramirez separated; Vergel married another man and had another child, Mike. During the late 80s until the early 90s, Mommy Alice as she was called was Barangay Captain in Barangay Manresa, Quezon City.

Death

Vergel died of natural causes in 1992.

Legacy
She was posthumously inducted to the Eastwood City Walk Of Fame Philippines in December 2006.

Filmography

 1937 - Teniente Rosario
 1949 - Bibingka'y Masarap (Sampaguita Pictures) (unreleased)
 1949 - Milagro ng Birhen ng mga Rosas (Sampaguita Pictures)
 1949 - Teniente Ramirez (Sampaguita Pictures)
 1950 - Huling Patak ng Dugo (Sampaguita Pictures)
 1950 - Mapuputing Kamay (Sampaguita Pictures)
 1951 - Bernardo Carpio  as Luningning (Sampaguita Pictures)
 1952 - Basahang Ginto as Orang (Sampaguita Pictures)
 1952 - Hiram na Mukha (Sampaguita Pictures)
 1952 - Madame X (Sampaguita Pictures)
 1953 - Diwani (Sampaguita Pictures)
 1954 - Aristokrata as Marieta Solomon (Sampaguita Pictures)
 1954 - Eskandalosa 
 1954 - MN as Ada (Sampaguita Pictures)
 1954 - Ukala: Ang Walang Suko (Sampaguita Pictures)
 1955 - Artista (Sampaguita Pictures)
 1955 - Balisong (Sampaguita Pictures)
 1955 - Kuripot (Sampaguita Pictures)
 1955 - Lupang Kayumanggi (Sampaguita Pictures)
 1955 - Mambo-Dyambo (Sampaguita Pictures)
 1956 - Taong Putik 
 1957 - Kahariang Bato 
 1957 - Maskara 
 1958 - Anak ng Lasengga 
 1958 - Cavalry Command  as Laura
 1958 - Obra Maestra (segment "Macao")
 1960 - Kadenang Putik 
 1961 - Konsiyerto ng Kamatayan (segment "Noche Azul")
 1965 - Tagani
 1976 - Tatlong Kasalanan 
 1977 - Inay as the title character
 1985 - Jandro Nakpil: Halang ang Kaluluwa
 1985 - Victor Lopez Jr.
 1987 - Saan Nagtatago ang Pag-Ibig? 
 1988 - Isusumbong Kita sa Diyos
 1989 - Bakit Iisa Lamang ang Puso? 
 1990 - Mundo Man ay Magunaw

References

External links 
 

1927 births
1992 deaths
Filipino people of Spanish descent
People from Ermita
Actresses from Manila
20th-century Filipino actresses